The National Association of Sewer Service Companies or NASSCO is a not-for-profit North American trade organization, established in 1976 "to increase the awareness of aging underground infrastructure and to provide viable solutions through education, technical resources and industry advocacy". NASSCO's intent is to research, train and educate members and non-members on rehabilitation of underground utilities using trenchless technology. Ultimately, NASSCO is committed to set the "industry standards for the rehabilitation of underground pipelines, and to assure the continued acceptance and growth of trenchless technologies".

Publications 
NASSCO has developed multiple publications covering varied topics. The following is the list of current publications.
 Manual of Practices
 Inspector's Handbook
 Specification Guidelines
 Trenchless Assessment Guide for Rehabilitation
 Pipeline Assessment & Certification Program (PACP) Reference Manual
 Inspector Training Certification Program (ITCP) for Cured-in-Place Pipes (CIPP)
 Inspector Training Certification Program (ITCP) for Manhole Rehabilitation
 Jetter Code of Practices
 RehabZone

References

External links 
 National Association of Sewer Service Companies

Tunnelling organizations
Trenchless technology